Mary Daly (1928–2010) was an American feminist theologian and academic.

Mary Daly may also refer to:

 Mary Daly (Australian writer) (1896–1983), Australian author, humanitarian and charity worker
 Mary Daly (sociologist), Irish sociologist and academic
 Mary E. Daly, Irish historian and academic
 Mary C. Daly, American economist